North Vassalboro is an unincorporated village in the town of Vassalboro, Kennebec County, Maine, United States. North Vassalboro has a post office with ZIP code 04962, which opened on March 22, 1828.

References

Villages in Kennebec County, Maine
Vassalboro, Maine